Minoli Salgado is a Sri Lankan writer and academic based in the United Kingdom who was born in Malaysia and educated mainly in England. She has written extensively on migrant studies and diasporic literature and is the author of the critically acclaimed work Writing Sri Lanka. She also writes fiction and poetry, and her debut novel A Little Dust on the Eyes won the inaugural  SI Leeds Literary Prize.

Biography
Born in Kuala Lumpur, Malaysia, Minoli Salgado was brought up in Sri Lanka, South East Asia and England, attending schools in Penang Hill, Colombo and North Devon, before going on to university studies in English Literature. She earned a BA degree from the University of Sussex, PGCE from University of Manchester, and after gaining a PhD in Indo Anglian fiction from the University of Warwick she returned to the University of Sussex where for many years she taught postcolonial literature, holding the positions of Tutorial Fellow, Lecturer, Senior Lecturer, Reader and Professor of English. In 2020 she joined Manchester Metropolitan University as Professor of International Writing, and she is founding Director of the Centre for Migration and Postcolonial Studies (MAPS).

Her 2006 book Writing Sri Lanka: Literature, Resistance and the Politics of Place is considered an influential study of Sri Lankan literature in English. The first major study of Sri Lankan literature in English, it was researched by Salgado supported by a Leverhulme Fellowship and AHRC Research Grant.

In 2012, her debut novel A Little Dust on the Eyes won the inaugural SI Leeds Literary Prize, and in 2014 was published by Peepal Tree Press, being launched that year at the Southbank Centre as part of the London Literature Festival. The novel was also longlisted for the DSC Prize for South Asian Literature.

Selected bibliography
 Writing Sri Lanka: Literature, Resistance and the Politics of Place (Routledge, 2007)
 A Little Dust on the Eyes – novel (Peepal Tree Press, 2014)
 Broken Jaw – short stories (London: The 87 Press, 2019)

References

Further reading
 Birte Heidemann, "'When the making of history was the making of silence': An Interview with Minoli Salgado", Postcolonial Text, Vol. 11, No 4 (2016).
 Liam O'Loughlin, A Different Way of Seeing”: An Interview with Minoli Salgado', ARIEL: A Review of International English Literature, 47.4 (2016), pp. 163–173.
 Azad Ashim Sharma, When Words Become Dangerous': In Conversation with Minoli Salgado", Wasafiri, 99 (Autumn 2019), pp. 20–25.

External links
 Official website

21st-century British women writers
Academics of Manchester Metropolitan University
Academics of the University of Sussex
Alumni of the University of Sussex
Date of birth missing (living people)
Living people
Sri Lankan people of Malaysian descent
Year of birth missing (living people)